"New York State of Mind" is a song written by Billy Joel that initially appeared on the album Turnstiles in 1976. Although it was never released as a single, it has become a fan favorite and a song that Joel plays regularly in concert. Joel famously played the song at The Concert for New York City, the October 2001 benefit concert for the New York City Fire and Police Departments and the loved ones of families of first responders lost during the terrorist attack on New York City on 9/11. He reprised that theme, playing it during his set at 12-12-12: The Concert for Sandy Relief at Madison Square Garden in New York City on December 12, 2012, where he changed lyrics to include the likes of "Breezy Point".

Inspiration
Joel wrote the song after returning to the East Coast from Los Angeles, where he had spent the previous three years. In fact, most of Turnstiles deals with Joel's cross-country relocation, including "Say Goodbye to Hollywood", "I've Loved These Days", "Summer, Highland Falls", and "Miami 2017 (Seen the Lights Go Out on Broadway)."

The inspiration for the song came from his pride in returning home to New York. Joel was literally "takin' a Greyhound [bus] on the Hudson River Line [route]" when the idea for the song came to him, and the song was written as soon as Joel arrived home.

Different sax solos

There are three studio versions of the song. The original version featured Richie Cannata on saxophone and appeared on the original Turnstiles album. Contrary to some sources, the sax solo on "New York State of Mind" was never re-recorded by Phil Woods for the release of Greatest Hits. The only time that Phil Woods performed on a Billy Joel recording was the song "Just the Way You Are" in 1977. The Quadrophonic LP release differs from both the original release and Greatest Hits version.

Personnel
Billy Joel – piano, vocals
Ken Ascher – orchestral arrangements
Richie Cannata – saxophone
Liberty DeVitto – drums
Doug Stegmeyer – bass

Covers
Since Joel first recorded and released the song in 1976, it has become a pop standard that has been covered by numerous artists, including Barbra Streisand, Lea Michele and Melissa Benoist, Joanna Wang, Ramin Karimloo, Shirley Bassey, Oleta Adams, Carmen McRae, Mark-Almond, Diane Schuur, Ben Sidran, Leslie West, RWB Ralph Williams Band, Mel Tormé, Frank Sinatra, Adam Pascal, Mike Finnigan, Tony Bennett and Floyd Pepper in an episode of The Muppet Show. Joel also said in an interview with Rolling Stone that he had wanted Ray Charles to record the song.

Bennett and Joel recorded a duet of the song for Bennett's 2001 album Playin' with My Friends: Bennett Sings the Blues and received a Grammy nomination for Best Pop Collaboration with Vocals at the 2002 Grammy Awards. The two performed the song on the award telecast that night. They performed the song again at Shea Stadium during Joel's concert in 2008 to commemorate the closing of the stadium.

Joel has also performed duets of the song with Elton John during their collaborative Face-To-Face Tour, with the country singer Garth Brooks during Brooks' Central Park Concert in 1997, and with Bruce Springsteen and the E Street Band as one of Springsteen's special guests during his performance at the "Rock and Roll Hall of Fame 25th Anniversary Concert" at Madison Square Garden in New York City on October 29, 2009.

The song was played in Boston by Emma Stanganelli, most notably in a duet with Billy Joel in Fenway Park during his 2014 tour.

In 2014, Joel re-recorded the song as a duet with Barbra Streisand for her album Partners. She had previously covered the song in 1977 for her album Superman.

Deana Martin recorded “New York State Of Mind” on her 2016 album Swing Street.

Jazz pianist Brad Mehldau covered the song on his 2020 album Suite: April 2020.

In popular culture

On television shows
The Muppets' Dr. Teeth and The Electric Mayhem performed the song on episode 2.9 of The Muppet Show featuring Madeline Kahn, for use as a UK spot. Floyd Pepper performed the lead vocals and played his bass guitar, with backup from Zoot on saxophone and Dr. Teeth on piano. They sang it again on the Tonight Show with Johnny Carson episode on April 2, 1979, when Kermit guest hosted the show. It was also recorded by Muppet Rowlf the Dog in 1984 and released on this album Ol' Brown Ears is Back in 1993.

Lea Michele and Melissa Benoist performed the song during the first episode of season 4 of the TV show Glee. It reached twenty-four on the Bubbling Under Hot 100 Singles chart. The song was also performed by Bernadette Peters in the final episode of the first season of the TV show Katy Keene. Skylar Astin performed the song on Episode 11 of season 2 of the NBC TV Show Zoey's Extraordinary Playlist.

In movies
In the 2004 film Garfield: The Movie, Garfield sings a parody of the song entitled, "New Dog State of Mind" after he is kicked out of the house for one night by his owner Jon for making a big mess in the house. Instead, he favors Odie more than Garfield.

In books
In 2004, it was announced that Joel had agreed to write two children's books for Scholastic, the U.S. publisher. The first book was entitled Goodnight, My Angel (A Lullabye). The second book was entitled New York State of Mind and is illustrated by the artist Izak. The large picture book comes with a CD of the song, the disc is illustrated with a picture of the Empire State Building by Izak.

Sports
This song is played  after every New York Boulders home loss at Clover Stadium and at the conclusion of the live racing day at Saratoga Race Course. It was previously played after New York Mets games at Shea Stadium.

Certifications

References

1976 songs
Billy Joel songs
Songs written by Billy Joel
Song recordings produced by Billy Joel
Songs about New York City
1970s ballads
Rock ballads
Jazz ballads
Barbra Streisand songs
Oleta Adams songs
Shirley Bassey songs